Australia women and New Zealand women played their inaugural test match on 2 September 1994 at Sydney, Australia. It was the Wallaroos first test and the Black Ferns fourth, with the latter winning that encounter 37–0. They occasionally compete for the Laurie O'Reilly Cup since its inception in 1994 with the Black Ferns winning all 19 games. They have met at the Rugby World Cup on three separate occasions — 2002, 2010, and at the delayed 2021 tournament hosted by New Zealand.

Summary

Results

See also 

 Laurie O'Reilly Cup

References

External links 

 Results Summary at stats.allblacks.com
 Wallaroos Results

Australia–New Zealand sports relations
Australia women's national rugby union team
New Zealand women's national rugby union team